Avtomanija is the leading Slovene automobile internet portal and magazine (2005-2010). The content is divided between automotive news, vehicle reviews, and motorsports coverage. Originally only a motoring website since 1998, expanded to magazine publishing in 2005. In the 2006, under the direction of longtime editor Artur Švarc, changed its name from Avtomania to Avtomanija, 32 page magazine published weekly. Name was changed due incorrect spelling of the word, which was in original partially English and partially Slovenian. Avtomanija was up to date Slovenia's only weekly automotive magazine.

References

External links
 Avtomanija internet portal
 F1Magazin internet portal

2005 establishments in Slovenia
2010 disestablishments in Slovenia
Automobile magazines
Defunct magazines published in Slovenia
Magazines established in 2005
Magazines disestablished in 2010
Online magazines with defunct print editions
Magazines published in Slovenia
Slovene-language magazines
Weekly magazines